With This Ring is a mystery novel by Mignon G. Eberhart published by Random House in 1941 and issued in the UK by Collins Crime Club that same year.

Reception
With This Ring was given a glowing review by Isaac Anderson in the New York Times. Anderson wrote: "One hesitates to say that this is the best of Mrs. Eberhart's books, for she has a long list of good mystery stories to her credit, but it is certainly not far from the best."

References

External links 
With This Ring at Kirkus Reviews

1941 American novels
American mystery novels
Novels set in New Orleans
Random House books
Novels by Mignon G. Eberhart